Gene Fondren (April 7, 1927 – October 12, 2010) was an American politician who served in the Texas House of Representatives from 1963 to 1969.

Career
Fondren ran the Texas Automobile Dealers Association for thirty years. He was given the Distinguished Service Citation Award by the Automotive Hall of Fame in 1993.

Death
He died on October 12, 2010, in Austin, Texas at age 83.

References

1927 births
2010 deaths
Democratic Party members of the Texas House of Representatives